The Beaux Arts Trio was a noted piano trio, celebrated for their vivacity, emotional depth and wide-ranging repertoire. They made their debut on 13 July 1955, at the Berkshire Music Festival, Lenox, Massachusetts, United States, known today as the Tanglewood Music Center. Their final American concert was held at Tanglewood on 21 August 2008. It was webcast live and archived on NPR Music. Their final concert was in Lucerne, Switzerland on 6 September 2008.

The Beaux Arts Trio recorded the entire standard piano trio repertoire. In 2005, the trio celebrated its 50th anniversary with two special CD issues, one featuring their most popular releases through their long years of recording (released by Philips Records), and the other an anniversary collection of new music (released by Warner Records).

Throughout its existence, the trio was held together by founding pianist Menahem Pressler. The original members of the trio when it was founded in 1955 were as follows:

Piano: Menahem Pressler
Violin: Daniel Guilet
Cello: Bernard Greenhouse

The violin and cello members changed on a number of occasions, with later members including the following:

 Violin: Isidore Cohen (1968–1992; formerly second violinist of the Juilliard String Quartet), Ida Kavafian (1992–1998), Yung Uck Kim (1998–2002), Daniel Hope (2002–2008)
 Cello: Peter Wiley (1987–1998; he then moved to Guarneri Quartet), Antonio Meneses (1998–2008)

In July 2015, Decca Classics released a 60-CD boxed set to mark their 60th anniversary.

See also
Beaux-Arts architecture
Beaux-Arts (Charleroi Metro)

References

External links
 Beaux Arts Trio website
 Beaux Arts Trio concerts and interviews on the NPR radio (especially the last concert)
 A live performance on YouTube of Dvořák's Dumky Trio, played on April 20, 2008, at the Herbst Theatre, San Francisco

1955 establishments in Massachusetts
2008 disestablishments in Switzerland
Chamber music groups
Piano trios
Musical groups established in 1955
Musical groups disestablished in 2008
Edison Classical Music Awards Oeuvreprijs winners